Riccardo Tempestini (born 9 October 1961) is an Italian former water polo player. He competed in the men's tournament at the 1988 Summer Olympics.

See also
 List of World Aquatics Championships medalists in water polo

References

External links
 

1961 births
Living people
Italian male water polo players
Olympic water polo players of Italy
Water polo players at the 1988 Summer Olympics
Sportspeople from Florence